Saint-Jude is a municipality in southwestern Quebec, Canada in the Regional County Municipality of Les Maskoutains. The population as of the Canada 2011 Census was 1,235.

Demographics

Population

Language

Communities
 Saint-Jude

See also
List of municipalities in Quebec

References

External links

Municipalities in Quebec
Incorporated places in Les Maskoutains Regional County Municipality